Podmieście may refer to the following places in Poland:

Podmieście, Lower Silesian Voivodeship (south-west Poland)
Podmieście, Gmina Głowaczów in Masovian Voivodeship (east-central Poland)